Fusicoccum is a genus of anamorphic fungi in the family Botryosphaeriaceae. There are over 90 species.

Species

F. abietis
F. acaciae
F. aceris
F. advenum
F. aesculanum
F.aesculi
F. africanum
F. albiziae
F. album
F. alni
F. alnicola
F. alocasiae
F. amygdali
F. amygdalinum
F. araucariae
F. asparagi
F. asperum
F. aucupariae
F. betulae
F. betulinum
F. brunaudii
F. cacti
F. cactorum
F. caraganae
F. carpini
F. cedrelae
F. cheiranthi
F. cinctum
F. coluteae
F. complanatum
F. corni
F. cornicola
F. coronatum
F. corylinum
F. corynocarpi
F. costesii
F. cryptomeriae
F. cryptosporioides
F. dakotense
F. daphneorum
F. depressum
F. dipsaci
F. elaeagni
F. elasticae
F. elasticum
F. ellisii
F. ericeti
F. eumorphum
F. euphorbiae
F. farlowianum
F. fibrosum
F. forsythiae
F. fraxini
F. gibberelloide
F. gloeosporioides
F. guttulatum
F. hapalocystis
F. hippocastani
F. homostegium
F. hoveniae
F. hranicense
F. ilicellum
F. ilicinum
F. indicum
F. jasminicola
F. jatrophae
F. juglandinum
F. juglandis
F. juniperi
F. kunzeanum
F. lahoreanum
F. lanceolatum
F. lesourdeanum
F. leucostomum
F. leucothoës
F. ligustri
F. liriodendri
F. macalpinei
F. macarangae
F. macrosporum
F. maesae
F. malorum
F. marconii
F. microspermum
F. microsporum
F. moravicum
F. myricae
F. myrtillinum
F. nervicola
F. noxium
F. obtusulum
F. operculatum
F. ornellum
F. oxalidicola
F. perniciosum
F. persicae
F. petiolicola
F. petrakianum
F. petrakii
F. phomiformis
F. pini
F. pithyum
F. pittospori
F. populi
F. populinum
F. proteae
F. pruni
F. pseudacaciae
F. pulvinatum
F. putrefaciens
F. pyrolae
F. pyrorum
F. quercus
F. ramosum
F. rimosum
F. rosae
F. rubrum
F. saccardoanum
F. sambucicola
F. sapoticola
F. sardoa
F. schulzeri
F. smilacinum
F. smilacis
F. sorbi
F. sordescens
F. spiraeae
F. syringae
F. syringicola
F. tanaense
F. testudo
F. tiliae
F. turconii
F. ubrizsyi
F. ulmi
F. umbrinum
F. veronense
F. viridulum
F. yuccigena
F. zanthoxyli

References

External links

Botryosphaeriaceae
Taxa named by August Carl Joseph Corda
Taxa described in 1829